This is a list of aircraft with delta wings.

|-
| Aérospatiale-BAC Concorde || UK/France || Supersonic || Transport || 1969 || Retired ||  || Ogival delta.
|-
| Antonov 'M' Masha || USSR || Supersonic || Fighter || 1947 || Prototype || || Tailless. Vertical stabilizers in the form of winglets.
|-
| Atlas Cheetah || South Africa || Supersonic || Fighter || 1986 || Production ||  || Canard development of the Dassault Mirage III
|-
| Avro Vulcan || UK || Subsonic || Bomber || 1952 || Retired ||  || Tailless.
|-
| Avro 707 || UK ||  || Experimental || 1949 || Prototype ||  || Tailless test aircraft for the Avro's jet bomber design
|-
| Avro Canada CF-105 Arrow || Canada || Supersonic || Fighter || 1959 || Prototype ||  || Tailless.
|-
| BAC 221 || UK || Supersonic || Experimental || 1964 || Prototype || 1 || Ogival delta wing fitted to a Fairey Delta 2 to test the Concorde design.
|-
| Boeing X-32 || US || Supersonic || Fighter || 2000 || Prototype ||  || Tailless JSF contender.
|-
| Boulton Paul P.111 || UK || Subsonic || Experimental || 1950 || Prototype ||  || Tailless.
|-
| Boulton Paul P.120 || UK || Subsonic || Experimental || 1953 || Prototype ||  || Tailed development of the P.111.
|-
| Buran || USSR || Spaceplane || Transport || 1988 || Prototype ||  || Tailless.
|-
| CAC CA-23 || Australia || Supersonic || Fighter || 1952 || Prototype ||  || Tailed delta.
|-
| Chengdu J-7 || China || Supersonic || Fighter || 1966 || Production ||  || Tailed. Chinese development of MiG-21
|-
| Chengdu J-9 || China || Supersonic || Fighter || 1998 || Prototype ||  || Canard.
|-
| Chengdu J-10 || China || Supersonic || Fighter || 1998 || Production ||  || Canard.
|-
| Chengdu J-20 || China || Supersonic || Fighter || 2011 || Production ||  || Canard.
|-
| Convair XF-92 || US ||  || Fighter || 1948 || Prototype ||  || Tailless
|-
| Convair F2Y Sea Dart || US || Supersonic || Fighter || 1953 || Prototype ||  || Tailless seaplane.
|-
| Convair F-102 Delta Dagger || US || Supersonic || Fighter || 1953 || Retired ||  || Tailless.
|-
| Convair XFY Pogo || US || Propeller || Experimental || 1954 || Prototype ||  || Tailless VTOL, propeller-driven.
|-
| Convair F-106 Delta Dart || US || Supersonic || Fighter || 1956 || Retired ||  || Tailless.
|-
| Convair B-58 Hustler || US || Supersonic || Bomber || 1956 || Retired ||  || Tailless.
|-
| Dassault Mirage I || France || Supersonic || Fighter || 1955 || Prototype ||  || Tailless.
|-
| Dassault Mirage III || France || Supersonic || Fighter || 1956 || Production ||  || Tailless.
|-
| Dassault Mirage IV || France || Supersonic || Bomber || 1959 || Production ||  || Tailless.
|-
| Dassault Mirage 5 || France || Supersonic || Fighter || 1965 || Production ||  || Tailless.
|-
| Dassault Mirage 2000 || France || Supersonic || Fighter || 1978 || Production ||  || Tailless.
|-
| Dassault Rafale || France || Supersonic || Fighter || 1986 || Production ||  || Canard.
|-
| Dyke Delta || US ||  || Private || 1966 || Homebuilt ||  || Double-delta.
|-
| Eurofighter Typhoon || EU || Supersonic || Fighter || 1994 || Production ||  || Canard.
|-
| Fairey Delta 1 || UK || Subsonic || Experimental  || 1951 || Prototype ||  || Tailed. Planned VTOL variant.
|-
| Fairey Delta 2 || UK || Supersonic || Experimental || 1954 || Prototype || 2 || Tailless. First aircraft to exceed 1,000 mph. One example rebuilt as BAC 221.
|-
| General Dynamics F-16XL || US || Supersonic || Experimental || 1982 || Prototype || 1 || Cranked arrow double-delta.
|-
| Gloster Javelin || UK || Subsonic || Fighter || 1951 || Production ||  || Tailed.
|-
| HAL Tejas || India || Supersonic || Fighter || 2001 || Production ||  || Tailless.
|-
| Handley Page HP.115 || UK || Subsonic || Experimental || 1961 || Prototype || 1 || Tailless narrow delta. Experimental into low speed performance of delta wing for Concorde
|-
| Helwan HA-300 || Egypt ||  || Fighter || 1969 || Prototype ||  || Tailed. Designed by Willy Messerschmitt for Hispano-Aviación in Spain.
|-
| IAI Kfir || Israel || Supersonic ||  || 1973 || Production ||  || Canard development of the Dassault Mirage III.
|-
| Lavochkin La-250 || USSR ||  || Fighter || 1956 || Prototype ||  || Tailed.
|-
| Lippisch DM1 || Germany || Glider || Experimental || 1944 || Prototype ||  || Tailless. Also known as the Akaflieg Darmstadt/Akaflieg München DM1.
|-
| Lockheed A-12 || US || Supersonic ||  || 1962 || Production ||  || Tailless with long chines. Mach 3+
|-
| Lockheed YF-12 || US || Supersonic || Fighter || 1968 || Prototype ||  || Tailless with long chines. Mach 3+
|-
| Lockheed M-21 || US || Supersonic ||  || 1966 || Prototype ||  || Tailless with long chines. Mach 3+ mothership for D-21.
|-
| Lockheed D-21 || US || UAV ||  || 1971 || Prototype ||  || Tailless with long chines. Launched from the M-21.
|-
| Lockheed SR-71 Blackbird || US || Supersonic ||  || 1964 || Production ||  || Tailless with long chines. Mach 3+
|-
| McDonnell Douglas A-4 Skyhawk || US ||  ||  || 1954 || Production ||  || Ogival delta, with tail.
|-
| Mikoyan-Gurevich MiG-21 || USSR || Supersonic ||  || 1956 || Production ||  || Tailed delta
|-
| Myasishchev M-50 || USSR ||  ||  || 1959 || Prototype ||  || 
|- 
| Moskalyev SAM-9 Strela|| USSR ||  || Experimental || 1934 || Prototype ||  || Tailless narrow, curved delta. 
|-
| NASA Space Shuttle Orbiter || US || Spaceplane || Transport || 1981 || Production ||  || Double delta.
|-
| North American XB-70 Valkyrie || US || Supersonic || Bomber || 1964 || Prototype ||  || Canard capable of Mach 3.
|-
| Payen PA-22 || France ||  ||  || 1941 || Prototype ||  || Tandem wing with straight canard plane and delta aft plane
|-
| Payen Pa 49 || France ||  ||  || 1954 || Prototype ||  || 
|- 
| Saab 35 Draken || Sweden || Supersonic ||  || 1955 || Production ||  || Double delta.
|-
| Saab 37 Viggen || Sweden || Supersonic ||  || 1967 || Production ||  || Canard. First close-coupled type.
|-
| Saab JAS 39 Gripen || Sweden || Supersonic ||  || 1988 || Production ||  || 
|-
| Shenyang J-8 || China || Supersonic ||  || 1969 || Production ||  || 
|-
| Short SC.1 || UK || Subsonic || Experimental || 1957 || Prototype || 1 || Tailless VTOL aircraft.
|-
| Sukhoi T-4 / 100 Sotka || USSR || Supersonic || Bomber || 1972 || Prototype ||  || Canard capable of Mach 3
|-
| Sukhoi Su-9 || USSR ||  ||  || 1956 || Production ||  || 
|-
| Sukhoi Su-11 || USSR ||  ||  || 1958 || Production ||  || 
|-
| Sukhoi Su-15 (Early models) || USSR || Supersonic || Fighter || 1962 || Production ||  || Tailed. Later models had a cranked leading edge.
|-
| Tupolev Tu-144 || USSR || Supersonic || Transport || 1968 || Production ||  || Double delta with retractable "moustache" foreplanes.
|-
| Verhees Delta D1 || France || Propeller || Private || 2004 || Homebuilt ||  || Cropped delta with elliptical planform.
|-
| Verhees Delta D2 || France || Propeller || Private || 2018 || Homebuilt ||  || Cropped delta with elliptical planform.
|}

References

Citations

Bibliography
Gunston, W. and Swanborough, G.; The Complete Book of Fighters, Salamander, 1994

delta